Rapti Zone was one of the fourteen zones of Nepal, comprising five districts, namely, Dang, Pyuthan, Rolpa, Rukum and Salyan. Here is district wise List of Monuments which is in the Rapti Zone.

Rapti Zone
 List of monuments in Dang District 
 List of monuments in Pyuthan District 
 List of monuments in Rolpa District 
 List of monuments in Rukum District
 List of monuments in Salyan District

References

Rapti Zone
Rapti Zone